Lycaneptia is a genus of longhorn beetles of the subfamily Lamiinae, containing the following species:

 Lycaneptia amicta (Klug, 1825)
 Lycaneptia nigrobasalis Tippmann, 1960

References

Hemilophini